Randall N. Bills is a game designer who has worked primarily on role-playing games.

Career
Randall N. Bills had been a fan of Battletech back in the early 1990s when he met then-line-developer Bryan Nystul at Gen Con 27 over an all-night game of The Succession Wars (1987). During the next year and a half, Bills had gotten to know some of the FASA staff better, even touring their Chicago headquarters, while simultaneously writing for the fan club's Mechwarrior Quarterly.  When FASA had an assistant developer job open up in late 1995, they had made sure Bills got the invitation and eventually hired him.  By 2000, Bills had become the Battletech Line Developer.  In the meantime Bills had also begun writing Battletech fiction, and produced two novels for the original era of the game: Path of Glory (2000) and Imminent Crisis (2002). After FASA, Bills went to work for WizKids. When WizKids acquired the rights to the future of the BattleTech Franchise (re-christened as MechWarrior), they approached several of the established BattleTech authors including Bills and Michael A. Stackpole  to resurrect the novel franchise. In 2001, FanPro LLC hired Bills to continue with his job as Battletech Line Editor; that made Bills FanPro LLC's second and only other employee. FanPro continued on with the Battletech line for the next few years, all under Bills' guidance.

Bills heard about Loren L. Coleman's idea for a new business, and in 2003 Coleman created the company InMediaRes Productions to hold his vision, which he founded with Heather Coleman, Randall Bills, Tara Bills, and Philip DeLuca. InMediaRes kicked things off with the fiction of founders Bills and Coleman. Bills continued working at WizKids through 2004. In 2007, Rob Boyle and Bills tried to buy FanPro LLC from Fantasy Productions and when that did not work out they threatened to leave and implied that they would be bidding for the WizKids licenses, which were just coming up for renewal. WizKids stepped in to mediate; although they were not willing to let Boyle and Bills create a new company, they were willing to give the licenses to InMediaRes. After acquiring the rights to Shadowrun and Battletech, InMediaRes took on Boyle and Bills as regular staff – which had been part of the agreement with WizKids; Boyle remained as the Shadowrun Line Editor for the next few years, while Bills became a managing director of InMediaRes (with Herb Beas taking over as Battletech Line Director). InMediaRes created the subsidiary Catalyst Game Labs to hold their new gaming rights. At the end of 2009, Catalyst did a financial audit and discovered that a substantial amount of money had gone missing; Bills would later explain the losses by saying that the audit had discovered that a "co-mingling of funds between the personal and business had occurred involving the company's primary shareholders".

References

External links
 Randall Bills :: Pen & Paper RPG Database archive

21st-century American novelists
Living people
Role-playing game designers
Year of birth missing (living people)